Viljo Vellonen (March 24, 1920 – February 5, 1995) was a Finnish cross-country skier. He won a silver medal in the  4 × 10 km relay at the 1950 FIS Nordic World Ski Championships in Lake Placid, New York.

Vellonen also finished sixth in the 18 km event at those same championships.

Cross-country skiing results
All results are sourced from the International Ski Federation (FIS).

World Championships
 1 medal – (1 silver)

References

External links

Finnish Skiers - Olympic and World Championship Results 

Finnish male cross-country skiers
1920 births
1995 deaths
FIS Nordic World Ski Championships medalists in cross-country skiing
20th-century Finnish people